Santafee is an unincorporated community in Summers County, West Virginia, United States.

The community's name most likely is derived from "Santa Fe".

References

Unincorporated communities in Summers County, West Virginia
Unincorporated communities in West Virginia